Freeney or Freeny is a surname. Notable people with the surname include:

 Dwight Freeney (born 1980), American football defensive end
 Jason Freeny (born 1970), American artist
 Jonathan Freeny (born 1989), American football linebacker